Tjerk Smeets (born 3 June 1980) is a Dutch baseball player who currently plays for Kinheim and the Dutch national team. He is the son of Dutch radio and television personality, writer, and columnist Mart Smeets.

Smeets played his college baseball in the United States. In 1999, he homered in his only at-bat and drew two walks. In 2000, he was one for two with a RBI. In 2001, he hit .159/.256/.304 in 30 games. He did homer in a game in which Middle Tennessee State set a school record with 8 circuit clouts. Smeets played for the Dutch team in the 2003 World Port Tournament, going 1 for 2 with a 2-run homer. As it was one of just two home runs in the event, Smeets won the World Port Tournament Home Run King award. In 2005, he hit .326/.433/.439 for the Amsterdam Pirates to finish 6th in the Hoofdklasse in average, 7th in OBP and 8th in slugging. He was 8th in walks (23) and tied for third with 3 homers, trailing Ivanon Coffie and Dirk van 't Klooster. He played for the Netherlands in the 2005 European Championship.

Smeets moved to Corendon Kinheim in 2006 and batted .349/.446/.454 with 36 RBI in 41 games and fielded .996 at catcher. He was 7th in average, 6th in slugging, third in OBP (behind Eugene Kingsale and Sidney de Jong), tied Reily Legito for the RBI lead, was third with 13 doubles (behind Yuji Nerei and Fausto Álvarez), tied Kingsale, Roel Koolen and Evert-Jan 't Hoen for 5th with 27 walks and tied Nerei for 5th with 53 hits. He hit .482 with runners in scoring position. Smeets won the Hoofdklasse MVP award, the 4th catcher so honored. He was 2 for 12 in the playoffs but 9 for 21 with 3 walks and five runs in five games in the Holland Series as Kinheim won the title.

Smeets was 0 for 2 in the 2006 Haarlem Baseball Week. In the 2006 Intercontinental Cup, he was 1 for 4 with a walk and two runs for the silver medalists, backing up de Jong at catcher. In the 2007 Hoofdklasse campaign, Smeets hit .294/.379/.531 with 36 runs and 43 RBI in 36 games and threw out 14 of 30 attempted base-stealers. He hit .300 with a .391 OBP in the playoffs then batted .333/.333/.400 in the 2007 Holland Series. He scored their first run in their successful championship defense and had three hits in game one; in game two, he was thrown out trying to score in a key play but Kinheim rallied to win. Smeets was 4th in slugging percentage in 2007, second to Alvarez in home runs (with 7), tied with Benjamin Dille for fifth in runs (36), first in RBI (six ahead of Martijn Meeuwis) and tied for 4th in doubles (13).

Smeets batted .263/.391/.316 for Kinheim in the 2007 European Cup, their first European Cup title ever. In the 2007 European Championship, Smeets was 1 for 5 with two walks and a time hit by pitch. Backing up de Jong, he only played against Sweden and Croatia. Smeets was 2 for 8 in the 2007 World Port Tournament but struck out four times. In the 2007 Baseball World Cup, Smeets was 3 for 6 with a homer. De Jong remained the starter in important games as Smeets only saw action at catcher against Germany. Smeets batted .421/.476/.526 to help Kinheim win the 2008 European Cup in Grosseto. His 7 RBI tied for the lead. He had the big hit of the competition; down 2–1 in the bottom of the 10th of the Gold medal games, Smeets doubled in René Cremer and Dirk van 't Klooster with a shot off of Linc Mikkelsen; Smeets had fouled off five pitches in a row before the double.

Smeets was selected by coach Robert Eenhoorn in the team that represents the Netherlands at the 2008 Summer Olympics in Beijing.

Personal 
During the closing ceremony of the 2008 Olympics in Beijing he proposed to his girlfriend, Dutch field hockey gold medalist, Minke Smabers, who accepted.

External links 
 Smeets's profile at honkbalsite.com

References 

1980 births
Baseball players at the 2008 Summer Olympics
Dutch expatriate baseball players in the United States
Living people
Olympic baseball players of the Netherlands
Sportspeople from Amsterdam
L&D Amsterdam Pirates players
Corendon Kinheim players